I Am Soldier is a 2014 British action thriller film directed by Ronnie Thompson and starring Tom Hughes, Noel Clarke and Alex Reid. The film follows a military chef, who attempts the Special Air Service (SAS) selection.

Plot 
Mickey Tomlinson (Tom Hughes) is a military chef who attempts the Special Air Service (SAS) selection. The SAS is the United Kingdom's and the world’s most renowned Special Forces Regiment. Mickey passes himself off as a weak chef to the other candidates, but it is fairly obvious he is hiding some type of military experience. During his attempt to join the SAS, he meets up with comrade, JJ (George Russo), who is attempting the test for the second time (only two attempts are allowed).

Along the way, the pair are grilled, pushed and encouraged through the intense test by an experienced SAS leader, Carter (Noel Clarke). They also encounter Dawn (Alex Reid), a female member of the elite operations unit. Throughout their test, they face physical and mental challenges. Only a handful of the candidates will make it to the final portion of the test, Escape and Evasion, which requires candidates to journey out into the snowy wilderness and evade their pursuers. If (When) they are caught, they will be tortured and questioned. Only a few will pass the Tactical Questioning test and be offered a spot within the SAS.

Cast
 Tom Hughes as Mickey
 Noel Clarke as Carter
 Alex Reid as Dawn
 George Russo as JJ
 Miranda Raison as Stella
 Josh Myers as Chris

Reception

The film was not widely reviewed, with zero reviews on Rotten Tomatoes.

References

External links 
 
 
 

British war films
British action thriller films
Films about the Special Air Service
2010s English-language films
2010s British films